Flat Lake is an unincorporated community in central Alberta in the Municipal District of Bonnyville No. 87, located  south of Highway 28,  southwest of Cold Lake.

Localities in the Municipal District of Bonnyville No. 87